Tanambao Daoud or Tanambao is a rural municipality in northern Madagascar. It belongs to the district of Sambava, which is a part of Sava Region. The population of the commune was estimated to be approximately 10,000 in 2001 commune census.

Only primary schooling is available in town. The majority 97.5% of the population in the commune are farmers.  The most important crops are coffee and vanilla, while other important agricultural products are banana and coconut.  Services provide employment for 2% of the population. Additionally fishing employs 0.5% of the population.

Roads
It is situated at the Provincial road 202D.

References  

Populated places in Sava Region